Grœnlendinga þáttr ('The Tale of the Greenlanders') or Einars þáttr Sokkasonar ('The Tale of Einarr Sokkason') is a short medieval Icelandic tale (þáttr). It is preserved in the manuscript Flateyjarbók, towards the end of the second half of the manuscript which was written by Magnús Þórhallsson. The author of the tale itself is unknown. The tale takes place in Greenland, and unlike Grœnlendinga þáttr (I), it makes no mention of Vinland.

In the tale, Einarr Sokkason brings a priest, Arnaldr, to Greenland from Norway to be Bishop of Greenland. Around this time, a Norwegian merchant named Arnbjörn sets off for Greenland, but is wrecked and his ship later found in a firth. Arnbjörn’s kinsmen sail to Greenland and request his recovered property.  The bishop refuses this, leading to feud between the two groups. A battle occurs in which men from both sides are killed, including Einarr Sokkason.

References

Further reading 

 Jones, Gwyn, trans. (1986) The Norse Atlantic Saga: Being the Norse Voyages of Discovery and Settlement to Iceland, Greenland, and North America, revised edition, Oxford: Oxford University Press, pp. 236-241

External links 

 Guðni Jónsson's edition at heimskringla.no
 Guðbrandur Vigfússon and Carl Richard Unger's edition at heimskringla.no
 Edition with modern Icelandic spelling at snerpa.is

Þættir
Flateyjarbók
Norse settlements in Greenland